Anne Vilde Tuxen (born 27 February 1998) is a Norwegian competitive diver, born in Tananger. She qualified to represent Norway at the 2020 Summer Olympics in Tokyo 2021, competing in women's 10 metre platform. She finished 28th in the event with a score of 219.15.

References

External links
 
 

 

1998 births
Living people
Sportspeople from Stavanger
Norwegian female divers
Divers at the 2020 Summer Olympics
Olympic divers of Norway
European Games competitors for Norway
Divers at the 2015 European Games